As of 2021, the discography of American Industrial metal band Ministry, which was founded and is fronted by Al Jourgensen, consists of fifteen studio albums, eight live albums, fourteen compilation and remix albums, thirty singles, five video albums (including video versions of live albums) and twenty music videos. Several tracks spanning from 1981 to 1994 in studio, live and cover formats have remained unreleased by the band.

Formed in 1981, the band made their recording debut with the single "I'm Falling / Cold Life", released by Wax Trax! Records in the US and Situation Two in the UK, respectively. Signing a short-lived contract with Arista Records, the band released their debut studio album, With Sympathy, which hit the upper 90s in the Billboard 200, in May 1983. Following a departure from Arista, Ministry returned on Wax Trax!, where several singles—including the club hit "(Every Day Is) Halloween"—were released in 1984–1985. After signing a deal with Sire Records in 1985, the band released the single “Over the Shoulder”, which was followed by the album Twitch in March 1986; co-produced by Jourgensen and Adrian Sherwood, Twitch hit No. 194 in the Billboard 200 and was regarded by profile commentators as a turning point in Ministry' artistic style.

In 1988-89, Ministry releases The Land of Rape and Honey and The Mind Is a Terrible Thing to Taste. Both positively received by music press, these two albums hit the upper 160s in the Billboard 200, and were certified gold by RIAA. During the tour in support of The Mind Is a Terrible Thing to Taste, the band recorded their debut live album, In Case You Didn't Feel Like Showing Up, released in 1990.

Albums

Studio albums

Live albums

Compilation and remix albums

Singles

Unreleased tracks

Boxed sets
Box (1993)
Just Another Fix (1995)
3 for One Box (2000)
Original Album Series (2011)
Trax Box! (2015)

Videos

Full length videos
In Case You Didn't Feel Like Showing Up (1990)
Tapes of Wrath (2000)
Sphinctour (2002)
Adios... Puta Madres (2009)

Music videos

Other appearances

Tribute albums
An Industrial Tribute to Ministry
Wish You Were Queer: A Tribute to Ministry
Another Prick In the Wall: A Tribute to Ministry - Volume 2
Devilswork: Tribute to Ministry

References

Notes

Citations

Further reading
 
 
 

Heavy metal group discographies
Discographies of American artists
Discography